Conchita Martínez defeated Martina Navratilova in the final, 6–4, 3–6, 6–3 to win the ladies' singles tennis title at the 1994 Wimbledon Championships. It was her first and only major title.

Steffi Graf was the three-time defending champion, but lost in the first round to Lori McNeil, ending her streak of 31 consecutive major quarterfinals, dating back to the 1985 US Open. This also marked the first time in the Open Era that a major defending champion lost in the first round of their title defense.

Seeds

  Steffi Graf (first round)
  Arantxa Sánchez Vicario (fourth round)
  Conchita Martínez (champion)
  Martina Navratilova (final)
  Jana Novotná (quarterfinals)
  Kimiko Date (third round)
  Mary Pierce (withdrew)
  Natasha Zvereva (first round)
  Lindsay Davenport (quarterfinals)
  Gabriela Sabatini (fourth round)
  Mary Joe Fernández (third round)
  Anke Huber (second round)
  Zina Garrison-Jackson (quarterfinals)
  Amanda Coetzer (fourth round)
  Sabine Hack (first round)
  Magdalena Maleeva (second round)
  Helena Suková (fourth round)

Mary Pierce withdrew due to personal reasons. She was replaced in the draw by the highest-ranked non-seeded player Helena Suková, who became the #17 seed.

Qualifying

Draw

Finals

Top half

Section 1

Section 2

Section 3

Section 4

Bottom half

Section 5

Section 6

Section 7

Section 8

References

External links

1994 Wimbledon Championships on WTAtennis.com
1994 Wimbledon Championships – Women's draws and results at the International Tennis Federation

Women's Singles
Wimbledon Championship by year – Women's singles
Wimbledon Championships